Ergün Penbe (born 17 May 1972), known by his nickname Kemik –literally meaning the Bone–, is a Turkish former professional footballer who played mostly as a left midfielder and left back, and is currently the manager of Tarsus İdman Yurdu.

He is known for his "fair play" approach to the game, having gone through two seasons of football without a single booking. He also received the nickname Kemik (the bone), because of his calmness and ability to hold the team together. He spent most of his professional career with Galatasaray, winning a total of 12 titles. He wore number 67 during his career in honor of the identifying vehicle plate code number of his hometown Zonguldak.

Club career
Born in Zonguldak, Black Sea, Ergün begun his professional career with Gençlerbirliği SK. After that, in the 1994 summer, he signed with top division giants Galatasaray SK, being one of the team's most influential players in the following decade (in a variety of positions, including left back), and playing a very important part in the side's exploits from 1999–2001, which brought a total of six titles – two domestic doubles, the UEFA Cup and the UEFA Super Cup; in the first competition's final, he scored in the penalty shootout win against Arsenal.

On 27 August 2007, 35-year-old Ergün signed a 1+1 year contract with Gaziantepspor. He made his debut for his new team on 31 October in a Turkish Cup clash against Fenerbahçe. After helping the side finish eighth in the league, with the player appearing in exactly half of the games, he decided to retire at the age of 36.

Immediately after retiring, Ergün was appointed as assistant manager of lowly Hacettepe Spor Kulübü on 5 November 2008. After Erdoğan Arıca's resignation he was promoted to head coach, but could not prevent the club from being relegated to the second division.

On 12 February 2010, Ergün signed with Mersin Idman Yurdu in that same category, until the end of the season.

International career
Ergün represented Turkey on 48 occasions, all of his caps coming whilst he was at Galatasaray, in a 12-year span.

He was part of the nation's final squads at UEFA Euro 2000 and the 2002 FIFA World Cup, playing in three matches in the former competition and five in the latter, as it respectively reached the quarterfinals and finished in third place.

Career statistics

Club

International

Managerial statistics

Honours
Galatasaray
Turkish League: 1996–97, 1997–98, 1998–99, 1999–2000, 2001–02, 2005–06
Turkish Cup: 1995–96, 1998–99, 1999–2000, 2004–05
UEFA Cup: 1999–2000
UEFA Super Cup: 2000

Turkey
FIFA World Cup: third place 2002
FIFA Confederations Cup: third place 2003

References

External links
 
 
 
 
 

1972 births
Living people
Sportspeople from Zonguldak
Turkish footballers
Association football midfielders
Süper Lig players
Gençlerbirliği S.K. footballers
Gaziantepspor footballers
Galatasaray S.K. footballers
Turkey international footballers
UEFA Euro 2000 players
2002 FIFA World Cup players
2003 FIFA Confederations Cup players
Turkish football managers
Süper Lig managers
Mersin İdman Yurdu managers
Kartalspor managers
Kayseri Erciyesspor managers
Turkey under-21 international footballers
UEFA Cup winning players
Mediterranean Games gold medalists for Turkey
Mediterranean Games medalists in football
Competitors at the 1993 Mediterranean Games